PagerDuty is an American cloud computing company specializing in a SaaS incident response platform for IT departments.

PagerDuty is headquartered in San Francisco with operations in Toronto, Atlanta, the United Kingdom, and Australia. Its platform is designed to alert clients to disruptions and outages. The software operates as a standalone service or can be integrated into existing IT systems. 

The company was ranked 41st on Forbes's "Cloud 100" list in 2017.

History
The company was founded 2009 in Toronto, Ontario, by University of Waterloo graduates Alex Solomon, Andrew Miklas, and Baskar Puvanathasan. The company was incubated at Y Combinator.

PagerDuty raised a seed funding round of $1.9 million in 2010, followed by a Series A round that raised $10.7 million in January 2013. As of 2018, the company has raised over $170 million in venture funding.

In July 2016, the former CEO of Keynote Systems, Jennifer Tejada, was named CEO of PagerDuty. Later that year, the company held its first PagerDuty Summit, an industry conference. Additional summits were held in San Francisco in 2017 and 2018.

PagerDuty announced a funding round in April 2017 led by Accel. The $43.8 million round included existing investors Andreessen Horowitz, Bessemer Venture Partners, Baseline Ventures and Harrison Metal.

In September 2018, PagerDuty raised $90 million in a round led by T. Rowe Price and Wellington Management.

In June 2018, PagerDuty launched Event Intelligence, a product designed to analyze incoming digital signals and human responses to communicate incident response suggestions to operators when new incidents occur. At its industry conference in September 2018, the company also launched PagerDuty Visibility and PagerDuty Analytics.

In March 2019, PagerDuty filed its S-1 with the SEC in anticipation of its IPO.

In April 2019, PagerDuty went public on the New York Stock Exchange.

In October 2020, PagerDuty completed the acquisition of Rundeck, a provider of DevOps automation.

On January 21, 2023 PagerDuty CEO Tejada's layoff memo was criticized for insensitivity for inappropriately quoting Martin Luther King, announcing promotions of executives, and tone deafness.

See also
Icinga
VictorOps

References

External links
 

Cloud computing providers
Software companies established in 2009
2009 establishments in Ontario
Companies based in San Francisco
Software companies based in the San Francisco Bay Area
2019 initial public offerings
Companies listed on the New York Stock Exchange
Software companies of the United States